Mary P. Koss (born Mary Lyndon Pease) is an American Regents' Professor at the University of Arizona, Mel and Enid Zuckerman College of Public Health in Tucson, Arizona. Her best known works have been in the areas of gender-based violence and restorative justice.

In 1987, Koss, along with her colleagues, Christine Gidycz and Nadine Wisniewski, published the first national study on rape. The study included the first presentation of the "one in four" statistic that created awareness of the extent of rape among college students, the development of a method for measuring rape, and coining terms such as "date rape" and "acquaintance rape".

Biography

Koss was born in Louisville, Kentucky. Koss's maternal grandparents (William and Marian Lyndon Bade) raised her and her four siblings for a period of time, while their mother rehabilitated from polio. Upon graduating high school at age 17, Koss attended the University of Michigan, where she met her husband, Paul G. Koss. After receiving her A.B. in Psychology with high distinction, she continued her education at the University of Minnesota-Twin Cities along with her husband. While he completed his medical degree, she pursued a PhD in Clinical Psychology. After receiving her doctorate, she completed her clinical psychology residency at the Minneapolis Veterans Administration Medical Center, where she worked with Vietnam War veterans in the area of rehabilitation psychology.

Career

 Koss joined the faculty of St. Olaf College as an assistant professor in August 1973. She then transferred to a research university, Kent State in 1976. During her time there, Mary Harvey, of Victims of Violence Center and National Institute of Mental Health, recruited her to lead a study on rape prevalence in collaboration with the Ms. Foundation for Research and Education. The project was federally funded through a competitive grants award process. Koss' work resulted in the 1987 publication, "The Scope of Rape: Incidence and Prevalence of Sexual Aggression and Victimization in a National Sample of Higher Education Students." This was the first national, large-scale survey on rape of its kind. As a result of this and other works, Koss has been credited with coining the terms "date rape", "hidden rape", "unacknowledged rape", "acquaintance rape", and "campus rape". She also published "The Hidden Rape Victim: Personality, Attitudinal and Situational Characteristics." In that paper, she defined the hidden rape victim as, "one who has never reported her experience to a rape crisis center or to police."

Koss defined the unacknowledged rape victims as women who have experienced the behaviors that define rape (oral, anal, or vaginal penetration against consent through force, bodily harm, or when incapacitated and unable to consent) but do not realize that their experience constitutes rape or chose not to view it that way. This is now a well-accepted finding reaffirmed by other investigators in national surveys repeated in the early 2000s and most recently reported in 2012. Koss has served as an invited speaker and guest lecturer around the world. In 1991, she testified as an expert witness at the U.S. Senate hearings that led to the first passage of Violence Against Women Act. Koss has since conducted multiple legislative testimonies, including expert witness testimonies to the U.S. Senate Veteran's Affairs Committee, U.S. News & World Report, Senator Cory Brooker on restorative justice, and US Advisory Commission on Child Abuse. Other legal testimony from Koss includes working with Congressional Briefing on Violence Against Women, and the Legislative Policy Brief released by the Evelyn Jacobs Ortner Center on Family Violence.

On the issue of male victims of rape, Koss has written: "Although consideration of male victims is within the scope of the legal statutes, it is important to restrict the term rape to instances where male victims were penetrated by offenders. It is inappropriate to consider as a rape victim a man who engages in unwanted sexual intercourse with a woman." (Koss 1993 pp 206–207). Elsewhere, she has argued that it is impossible for a woman to rape a man: "How would [a man being raped by a woman] happen… how would that happen by force or threat of force or when the victim is unable to consent? How does that happen?", adding that she would describe this as "unwanted contact".

Koss was offered a faculty position in the Department of Psychiatry at the University of Arizona in 1987 and later transferred to the Mel and Enid Zuckerman College of Public Health in the Division of Health Promotion Sciences. Koss has been at the University of Arizona for 27 years, earning tenure in 1988 and designation Regents' Professor in November 2006.

In her academic career, Koss has published close to 300 works on violence against women, including 145 peer-reviewed scientific articles as well as books, book chapters, and briefs. Her work has been cited over 41,000 times. In addition to the Ms. Study, Koss has led 10 other federally funded research projects. Koss is globally recognized and has been invited as a panelist and speaker to multiple conferences held by the National Institute of Mental Health, the National Coalition for Women's Mental Health, the National Institute of Justice, and others. She has also been a consultant and reviewer for organizations such as the American Psychiatric Association, American Psychological Association, World Bank, the Centers for Disease Control and Prevention, the United States Department of Justice, the World Health Organization, and others. Koss is a Life Member of the American Psychological Association since 1976.

Restorative justice programs

At the University of Arizona, Koss pioneered a restorative justice program, RESTORE. RESTORE is a voluntary conferencing program for adult misdemeanor and felony sexual assault perpetrators who are referred by a prosecutor. "The RESTORE Program for Restorative Justice for Sex Crimes: Vision, Process and Outcomes" is published in the Journal of Interpersonal Violence. "The paper is the first peer-reviewed quantitative evaluation of RJ conferencing for adult sexual assault."  Koss and her colleagues from The University of Michigan and Carleton College also collaborated on the article titled, "Campus Sexual Misconduct: Restorative Justice Approaches to Enhance Compliance with Title IX Guidance." This article is  published in Trauma, Violence and Abuse: A Review Journal.

Honors and awards

Koss has received over 20 awards and over 70 recognitions throughout her career. Along with her honors and awards, she has been a distinguished member of professional organizations such as the American Psychological Association. Koss also was the first recipient and namesake of the Mary P. Koss Profile in Courage Award from the One-in-Four Organization. This award will be given to another person annually.  
 Stephen Schafer Award, National Organization for Victim Assistance (NOVA)
 Distinguished Contribution to Women's Health, American Psychological Association, Committee on Women in Psychology
 Distinguished Service Award for the book, No Safe Haven, Male Violence Against Women at Home, at Work, and in the Community
 Heritage Award recognizing a substantial and outstanding body of work, American Psychological Association, Division 35 (Psychology of Women)
 Distinguished Contributions to Research in Public Policy, American Psychological Association
 American Psychological Association Committee on Women in Psychology Leadership Award (Senior Career)
 Presidential Citation, American Psychological Association
 Visionary Award from End Violence Against Women International
Distinguished Publication Award, Association for Women in Psychology
Brother Peace Award, National Association of Men Against Sexism
Distinguished Contribution to the Science of Psychology Award, Arizona Psychological Association
Distinguished Scholarly Contribution to Research on Acquaintance Rape, Safe Schools Coalition
Distinguished Contribution to Women's Health, American Psychological Association, Committee on Women in Psychology
Heritage Award recognizing a substantial and outstanding body of work, American Psychological Association, Division 35 (Psychology of Women)
Excellence in Teaching and Commitment to Public Health Faculty Award, Public Health Alliance, University of Arizona
American Psychological Association Committee on Women in Psychology Leadership Award (Senior Career)
Mel and Enid Zuckerman Arizona College of Public Health Research Prize
Presidential Citation, American Psychological Association
Visionary Award from End Violence Against Women International (7th Awardee)
Mary P. Koss Profile in Courage Award, One-in-Four Organization
American Psychological Association Award for Contributions to the International Advancement of Psychology
University of Minnesota Psychology Distinguished Alumni Award
Albert Nelson Marquis Lifetime Achievement Award (Marquis Who's Who)
Lifetime Achievement in Violence Against Women Research and Advocacy, Institute for Trauma, Violence and Abuse
Caroline Wood Sherif Award for Contributions to the Psychology of Women, American Psychological Association, Division 35

Selected publications

Books

Chapters in books

Journal articles
 
  Pdf.
 
 
  Pdf.
 
 
 
 
  Pdf.
 
 
  Pdf.
 
  Pdf.

Reports 

 Koss, Mary P & White, Jacquelyn W. (May 2021). VAWA Reauthorization Presents an Opportunity for Bold Transformation. The Gender Policy Report. https://genderpolicyreport.umn.edu/vawa-reauthorization-presents-an-opportunity-for-bold-transformation/

Mentions 

 Who's Who (Marquis) Biographee
 1983 18th edition, Who’s Who in American Women
 1987 21st edition, Who’s Who in the Midwest
 1988 2nd edition Who’s Who in Emerging Leaders
 1991 3rd edition, Who’s Who in Emerging Leaders
 1992 18th edition Who’s Who in American Women
 1993 24th edition, Who’s Who in the West
 2000 55th edition, Who’s Who in America
 2003 6th edition, Who’s Who in American Education
 2000 55th edition, Who’s Who in America
 2006 9th edition, Who’s Who in Science and Engineering
 2006 26th edition, Who’s Who in American Women
 2008 27th edition, Who’s Who in American Women
 2013- 67th and continuous subsequent editions, Who’s Who in America, confirmed through 2022

References

Further reading

 "The Scope of Rape: Incidence and Prevalence of Sexual Aggression and Victimization in a National Sample of Higher Education Students" (1987)
 Koss, M.P., Stone, M. (2006). "Current trends in psychological assessment and treatment approaches for survivors of sexual trauma."
 Koss, M., Achilles, M. (2008). "Restorative justice responses to sexual assault."
 Lonsway, K.A., Banyard, V.L., Berkowitz, A.D., Gidycz, C.A., Katz, J.T., Koss, M.P., Schewe, P.A., Ullman, S.E., Edwards, D. "Rape prevention and risk reduction: Review of the literature for practitioners."
 Sexual Violence: Prevention Strategies. (2014)

External links
 Mary P. Koss at the University of Arizona's College of Public Health

Living people
Clinical psychologists
University of Arizona faculty
University of Michigan College of Literature, Science, and the Arts alumni
St. Olaf College faculty
People from Louisville, Kentucky
Year of birth missing (living people)
American women academics